Kim Il (born 27 February 1962) is a South Korean modern pentathlete. He competed at the 1984 Summer Olympics, finishing in 42nd place in the individual event.

References

1962 births
Living people
South Korean male modern pentathletes
Olympic modern pentathletes of South Korea
Modern pentathletes at the 1984 Summer Olympics